The Philippines competed in the Winter Olympic Games for the first time at the 1972 Winter Olympics in Sapporo, Japan with two athletes who competed in alpine skiing. The country was also the first tropical nation and Southeast Asian country to feature in the Winter Olympics.

Alpine skiing

Cousins Juan Cipriano and Ben Nanasca represented the Philippines in alpine skiing. They were adopted as teenagers by a family in New Zealand and were part of a development team funded by the Swiss government.

Men

Men's slalom

To commemorate the first participation of the above Filipino athletes in the first Winter Olympic Games in Asia, a leading Manila film company, Sampaguita Pictures and the Vera-Perez family behind it, filmed a feature film, Winter Holiday, on location in Sapporo and around the Games.  Winter Holiday was a musical film which starred the most popular duo of singing film stars in Filipino movies at that time--Nora Aunor and Tirso Cruz; and also the above-named skiers, Ben Nanasca and Johnny Cipriano, in minor roles playing themselves.  The film debuted at the Manila Film Festival that year.

References

External links
Official Olympic Reports
 Olympic Winter Games 1972, full results by sports-reference.com

Nations at the 1972 Winter Olympics
1972
Winter Olympics